Chathurani Gunawardene (born 31 December 1990) is a professional Sri Lankan international cricketer. An all-rounder, she is a left-handed batsman and a right-arm medium-fast bowler. Chathurani made her ODI debut for Sri Lanka during the Pakistan cricket team toured Sri Lanka in 2015. T20 debut for Sri Lanka during the West Indies cricket team toured Sri Lanka in 2015. She also played matches Kurunegala Youth Cricket Club. She only played 2 ODI matches and 5 T20 matches. Poor batting and bowling performance she failed to take a wicket in 7 matches remain.

References 

1990 births
Living people
Kurunegala Youth Cricket Club women cricketers
Sri Lankan women cricketers
Sri Lanka women One Day International cricketers
Sri Lanka women Twenty20 International cricketers
21st-century Sri Lankan women
Sinhalese women